San Agustín del Guadalix  is a Spanish town located north of the Comunidad de Madrid, near to Sierra de Guadarrama.

It is bordered by Pedrezuela to the north, the municipalities of El Molar and Algete to the east and Colmenar Viejo to the south and west.

The origin of the town is obscure, but it appears that it was settled by the Iberians in the pre-Christian era. Proximity to Madrid has made it popular as a commuter base, resulting on its population more than tripling from 2,459 inhabitants in the late 20th century to over 9,000 in 2006.  This has substantially changed the face of the town, resulting in blocks of flats replacing the older two-storey buildings as the preferred means of accommodation. Furthermore, the traditional agriculture and livestock industries have been superseded by heavy industry.

The town's main festival takes place the third Sunday of May in honour of the Virgin of Navalazarza.

Bus lines 

 191: Madrid (Plaza de Castilla) - Buitrago del Lozoya

 193: Madrid (Plaza de Castilla) - Pedrezuela - El Vellón

 194: Madrid (Plaza de Castilla) - Rascafría

 195: Madrid (Plaza de Castilla) - Braojos

 196: Madrid (Plaza de Castilla) - La Acebeda (Only at weekends)

 727: Colmenar Viejo - San Agustín de Guadalix

 104 (night service): Madrid - San Agustín de Guadalix - Pedrezuela - Venturada

References

External links
 Official website 
 infoSanAgustin.com Digital journal of San Agustín del Guadalix 
 City information on the Community of Madrid Official Site 

Municipalities in the Community of Madrid